Kauguri Parish is an administrative unit of Valmiera Municipality, Latvia.

Towns, villages and settlements of Kauguri parish 
 Mūrmuiža

Parishes of Latvia
Valmiera Municipality
Vidzeme